Léonard Thurre (born 9 September 1977) is a Swiss former international footballer.

Career
After 8 caps with no goals, Thurre was recalled to the Swiss international set-up in 2004, being included in the 26-man provisional squad for the UEFA Euro 2004, however he did not make the final squad.

After retiring, Thurre took up a position as sports director of former club Lausanne-Sport, a position he held for a year until he mutually agreed to leave the club. It was reported that he wanted more responsibilities, which the club was unwilling to offer.

Personal life
Thurre has a son, Maxence, who was born on 27 May 2012.

Career statistics

International

Honours 
Sion
Swiss Cup: 2005–06

References

External links
 

1977 births
Living people
Swiss men's footballers
Switzerland international footballers
FC Lausanne-Sport players
Servette FC players
FC Sion players
FC Echallens players
Swiss Super League players
Swiss Challenge League players
Sportspeople from Lausanne
Association football forwards